Allen Sharp (February 11, 1932 – July 9, 2009) was a United States district judge of the United States District Court for the Northern District of Indiana.

Education and career

Born in Washington, D.C., and raised in the small town of Story Indiana, Sharp received a Bachelor of Arts degree from Indiana State University in 1953, a Juris Doctor from Indiana University Maurer School of Law in 1957, and later received a Master of Arts from Butler University in 1986. He was a United States Air Force Reserve Lieutenant Colonel from 1957 to 1984. He was in private practice of law in Williamsport, Indiana from 1957 to 1968. He was a judge of the Indiana Court of Appeals from 1969 to 1973.

Federal judicial service

On September 13, 1973, Sharp was nominated by President Richard Nixon to a seat on the United States District Court for the Northern District of Indiana vacated by Judge Robert A. Grant. Sharp was confirmed by the United States Senate on October 4, 1973, and received his commission on October 11, 1973. He served as Chief Judge from 1981 to 1996, and assumed senior status on November 1, 2007, and served in that capacity until his death on July 9, 2009, in Granger, Indiana.

References

Sources
 

1932 births
2009 deaths
Judges of the United States District Court for the Northern District of Indiana
United States district court judges appointed by Richard Nixon
20th-century American judges
United States Air Force officers
People from Washington, D.C.
People from Williamsport, Indiana
Butler University faculty
Milligan University
Butler University alumni